Abdul Aziz Al-Maqaleh (Arabic:; 1937 – 28 November 2022) was a Yemeni poet and writer.  He followed the school of free poetry and he was the Yemen's first poet to win the Al-Owais cultural Award.

Life and career
Al-Maqaleh was born in 1937 in the village of Maqaleh in the governorate of Ibb and studied and finished his  BA in 1970. In 1977, he received his master's degree and PhD from Ain Shams University in Cairo, Egypt.

From 1982 to 2001, Al-Maqaleh worked as the President of Sana'a University, and then as the Head of the Center for Studies and Research Yemen, Sanaa.

Al-Maqaleh died in Sana'a on 28 November 2022, at the age of 85.

Works

Selected Poetry 

 There Must be Sanaa, 1971
 Marib Speaks (in conjunction with Ambassador Abdu Othman), 1972
 A Letter to Saif bin Dhi Yazan, 1973
 Yemeni Footnotes On the Alienation of Ibn Zreik al-Baghdadi,1974
 The Return of Waddah Yemen,1976
 Writing with the Rebellious Sword of Ali bin al-Fadl, 1978
 Exiting from the Sulaymaniyah Circles of Time, 1981
 Papers of a Body Returning from Death, 1986
 Alphabet of the Soul, 1998
 A Book of Sanaa, 1999
 A Book of the Village
 A Book of the Village, 2002
 A Book of Bilqis and Poems to the Waters of Grief, 2004
 A Book of Cities Literary and Intellectual Studies (translated), 2005

Selected literature studies and critics 
 A Reading in Contemporary Yemeni Literature, 1977
 Colloquial Poetry in Yemen, 1978
 Poets from Yemen
 Yemeni Diaries in Literature and Art
 Al-Zubairy: The Inner National and Cultural Voice of Yemen, 1980
 Inscriptions of Marib,
 Substantive and Technical Dimensions of Contemporary Poetry Movement in Yemen
 Voices from the New Era
 A Reading Zaidi and Nonconformists Thought
 The Crisis of the Arabic Poem
 Priorities of literary criticism in Yemen
 Theatre Beginnings in Yemen

Awards 
Lotus Award, 1986
Order of Arts and Letters, Aden, 1980
Order of Arts and Letters, Sanaa, 1982
Sharjah Prize for Arab Culture, in collaboration with UNESCO, Paris, 2002
Knight Award of the first degree in literature and arts from the French Government, 2003
Arab Culture Award, Arab Organization for Education, Culture and Science, 2004

See also
 Abdullah Al-Baradouni

References

 

1937 births
2022 deaths
20th-century Yemeni poets
20th-century Yemeni writers
21st-century Yemeni writers
Yemeni poets
People from Ibb Governorate
Ain Shams University alumni
Academic staff of Sanaa University
Presidents of Sanaa University
21st-century Yemeni poets
Members of Academy of the Arabic Language in Cairo